is an athletic stadium in Nirasaki, Yamanashi, Japan. It was the home field of the Ventforet Kofu Association football club from Kōfu from 1999 to 2000, and has been used as a training ground by that team since. It is also the home ground of the Yamanashi Prefectural League team Astros Nirasaki.

References

External links
  Nirasaki official site 

Football venues in Japan
Sports venues in Yamanashi Prefecture
Nirasaki, Yamanashi
Ventforet Kofu